Elwick Road is a major arterial road that runs through the northern suburbs of Hobart, Tasmania. The Road is the major link road between the Main Road and the Brooker Highway that connects to Glenorchy. The Road Passes through residential areas.

The Tasmanian Department of Infrastructure, Energy and Resources proposes to re-align Elwick Road with Goodwood Road, reducing confusion and the number of traffic lights on the Brooker Highway.

See also

References

Streets in Hobart
Glenorchy, Tasmania